Raymond Hughes may refer to:

Raymond Davies Hughes, Welsh RAF airman, made propaganda broadcasts in Welsh for the Nazis during World War II
Raymond Hughes (Manitoba politician), Canadian politician
Raymond Hughes (conductor), former director of the Cape Town Philharmonia Choir